The Aneuk Jamee or Ughang Jamu people are a group of people spread along the west and south coast of Aceh, starting from Singkil, South Aceh Regency, Southwest Aceh Regency and Simeulue Regency. The Aneuk Jamee people are originally Minangkabau people who have migrated to Aceh in the 19th century, and intermarried with the Acehnese people, Kluet people, Singkil people and Devayan people. In terms of language, the Anuek Jamee language is considered as a dialect of the Minangkabau language that has a mixture of Aceh's native languages.

Etymology
The name "Aneuk Jamee" comes from the Acehnese language which literally means "children" (aneuk) and "guest" (jamee) or "children of guests".

History

Story has it that during the Padri War, the vicar fighters were cornered by the attacks of the Dutch East Indies. The coast line of the Minangkabaus at that time were a part of the Aceh kingdom, sent military aid. When the situation became critical, the people were forced to leave. Thus at that time, the Minangkabau people started to spread towards the southwest coast of Aceh. It is also said that South Aceh Regency was a stop-by for pilgrimers from West Sumatra sailing for Mecca.

Diaspora
The Aneuk Jamee people can be found especially in South Aceh Regency (approximately 50% of the population) and to a certain extent in Southwest Aceh Regency, West Aceh Regency, Aceh Singkil Regency and Simeulue Regency.

Regions that are inhabited by the Aneuk Jamee people:-

Language
The Minangkabau language is still used by the Aneuk Jamee people but the language is assimilated with the Acehnese language, thus making it Jamee (guest) language. There are not much changes made to the language except for a few consonants, vocals and changes in the dialect. In terms of linguistic classification, the Jamee language still belongs to the Minangkabau language as a dialect. However, due to the influence of cultural assimilation for a long time, most of the Aneuk Jamee people, especially of those who occupy regions that are dominated by the Acehnese people for example West Aceh Regency, the Aneuk Jamee language is only used among the older generations. Today the Acehnese language is much widely used as the lingua franca.

List of Aneuk Jamee people
 Abuya Muda Waly, Acehnese great ulama
 Ismail Suny, diplomat

References

Ethnic groups in Indonesia
Ethnic groups in Aceh
Minangkabau
Muslim communities of Indonesia